Live in America is a two-disc live album by Neil Diamond released by Columbia Records in the summer of 1994.  It reached number 93 on the Billboard 200 chart.  As with his previous live albums Hot August Night and Hot August Night II Diamond performed his old hits with his version of his 1968 song "Red Red Wine" rendered in a reggae style similar to the version done by UB40.

Reception
In his review of the album music critic Stephen Thomas Erlewine states that Diamond "gives one hell of a show".

Track listing

Personnel
Neil Diamond - vocals, acoustic guitar
Doug Rhone, Hadley Hockensmith - guitar
Jesse Diamond - acoustic guitar
Reinie Press - bass
Alan Lindgren, Tom Hensley - keyboards
Ron Tutt - drums
Vince Charles - percussion
King Errisson - congas
Don Markese - saxophone, flute, clarinet
Larry Klimas - saxophone, flute
Ralf Rickert - trumpet, flugelhorn
Arturo Velasco - trombone
Craig Copeland, Josef Powell, Julia Waters, Maxine Waters, Oren Waters, Raven Kane - singers
Linda Press - backing vocals

References

Neil Diamond live albums
1994 live albums
Columbia Records live albums